Herbert Mörtl (born 4 November 1948) is an Austrian ice hockey player. He competed in the men's tournament at the 1976 Winter Olympics.

References

1948 births
Living people
Olympic ice hockey players of Austria
Ice hockey players at the 1976 Winter Olympics
People from Reutte District
Sportspeople from Tyrol (state)